Leslie Harvey Fleming (August 7, 1915 – March 5, 1980) was an American professional baseball first baseman whose 20-year career included all or parts of seven seasons in Major League Baseball as a member of the  Detroit Tigers, Cleveland Indians (– and –), and Pittsburgh Pirates.

Fleming's professional playing career lasted from 1935 through 1956; he did not play during the 1943 and 1944 wartime seasons. During his MLB tenure, he appeared in 434 games, and batted .277 with 199 runs batted in. His 369 hits included 69 doubles, 15 triples and 29 home runs. In 1942, as Cleveland's regular first baseman, he set personal bests in games played (156, tied for the American League lead), and most offensive categories. During his long career in minor league baseball, he was selected the Most Valuable Player of the 1948 American Association. In 1950, he knocked in 138 runs in the Pacific Coast League, another Triple-A circuit, but finished 18 RBI behind the league's leader, Harry Simpson.

As a member of the Indians during the 1947 season, Fleming became a teammate of Larry Doby when Doby broke the color barrier in the American League on July 5. On that day the Indians were preparing for a match against the Chicago White Sox at Comiskey Park. Fleming was one of the Indians who turned his back to Doby when player-manager Lou Boudreau introduced Doby to his new Indians' teammates in the clubhouse before the game.

References

External links

1915 births
1980 deaths
Alexandria Aces players
American Association (1902–1997) MVP Award winners
Baseball players from Texas
Beaumont Exporters players
Buffalo Bisons (minor league) players
Cleveland Indians players
Dallas Eagles players
Detroit Tigers players
Indianapolis Indians players
Major League Baseball first basemen
Minor league baseball managers
Nashville Vols players
Pittsburgh Pirates players
People from Cleveland, Texas
People from Grimes County, Texas
St. Mary's Rattlers baseball players
San Antonio Missions players
San Francisco Seals (baseball) players
Shreveport Sports players
Toledo Mud Hens players
Toronto Maple Leafs (International League) players